Pleiomorpha eumeces is a moth of the family Gracillariidae. It is known from South Africa.

The larvae feed on Diospyros lycioides and Royena pallens. They probably mine the leaves of their host plant.

References

Endemic moths of South Africa
Gracillariinae
Moths of Africa
Moths described in 1961